The women's 400 metres T38 event at the 2020 Summer Paralympics in Tokyo, took place between 3 and 4 September 2021.

Records
Prior to the competition, the existing records were as follows:

Results

Heats
Heat 1 took place on 3 September 2021, at 21:43:

Heat 2 took place on 3 September 2021, at 21:51:

Final
The final took place on 4 September 2021, at 20:38:

References

Women's 400 metres T38
2021 in women's athletics